North Star (also known as Northern Star) is an Israeli teen drama series of The Walt Disney Company, which was produced by Herzliya Studios. The series premiered on Disney Channel Israel on 30 November 2014. Disney Channel Israel gave the green light for the production of a final second season in February 2015, which was first shown on 6 March 2016. In the series North Star some actors from the Israeli Disney Channel Original Series Summer Break Stories appear as their characters. The finale of North Star was broadcast on June 16, 2016 by Israeli Disney Channel.

The British Disney Channel produced an adaptation under the title The Lodge which premiered in September 2016.

Plot 
The 15-year-old Maya from Tel Aviv moves with her father Ehud to a remote village to manage the hotel North Star. The hotel is currently owned by Gideon, Maya's grandfather and the father of her mother who died two years earlier. Arriving at the hotel, Maya tries to make a new beginning, and to build a new life. But Maya's new life is not free from complications. Maya must navigate through the everyday stresses of life of a teenager, and must protect herself from false friends. Complicating it is, that there is a new woman named Yuly in her father's life, that Maya finds difficult to handle. Fortunately, Maya finds new friends and falls in love with a boy named Sean. But soon after, Maya learns a secret that could not only turn their lives upside down, but also may lead to the closure of the hotel.

Characters

Main 
 Ariel Mortman as Maya 
 Guy Kally as Sean 
 Eyan Pinkovich as Danielle 
 Lin Asherov as Noa 
 Yuval Shevach as Edo
 Gal Goldstein as Ben 
 Hila Lusia as Gal 
 Asaf Yuval as Lior
 Yoni Green as Omer 
 Amit Moscovitz as Roni

Recurring 
 Alon Neuman as Ehud 
 Efrat Boimold as Yuly 
 Amnon Wolf as Gil 
 Rama Messinger as Iris 
 Avishag Rabiner as Ella 
 Maayan Blum as Tal 
 Daniel Sabag as Alon 
 Israel Bright as Moshik
 Omri Loukas as Oz
 Dror Yarden as Ofek
 Ilan Dar as Gideon

Guest stars 
 Yonatan Bashan as Adam
 Michaela Elkin as Karin
 Gaya Gur Arie as Eleanor
 Esti Tayeb as Shiri
 May Meir as Sivan
 Tamara Galoz-Eilay as Amber
 Lee Lotan as Daria
 Shai Gabso as Michael

Episodes

References

External links 
 Official Israeli website to Series 
 Information about the actors and the series 

2014 Israeli television series debuts
Israeli drama television series
Israeli teen drama television series
Disney Channels Worldwide original programming
Television series by Disney